Save Yourself is the sixth full-length studio album recorded by the various M.S.G. lineups, and the second album credited specifically to McAuley Schenker Group. It was released in 1989 on Capitol Records. "Save Yourself", "Anytime" and "This Is My Heart" were all singles released from the record. The album peaked at No. 92 on Billboard 200 Album chart.

Track listing
"Save Yourself" (Robin McAuley, Michael Schenker) – 6:16   
"Bad Boys" (McAuley, Schenker) – 4:04    
"Anytime" (Steve Mann, McAuley) – 5:44    
"Get Down to Bizness" (McAuley, Rocky Newton) – 4:22  
"Shadow of the Night" (McAuley, Schenker) – 5:20   
"What We Need" (McAuley, Schenker) – 4:13    
"I Am Your Radio" (Newton, Kenny Stewart) – 4:47 
"There Has to Be Another Way" (instrumental) (Schenker) – 1:49   
"This Is My Heart" (Newton, McAuley, Schenker, Mann, Bodo Schopf, Allan Nelson) – 4:57  
"Destiny" (Mann, McAuley) – 4:33 
"Take Me Back" (Newton, Stewart) – 4:50

2000 Japanese remaster bonus tracks
"Save Yourself" (single edit) (McAuley, Schenker) – 4:59
"Anytime" (single edit) (Mann, McAuley) – 5:10
"Vicious" (bonus track) (McAuley, Schenker) – 3:38

Personnel
Band members
Robin McAuley – lead & backing vocals
Michael Schenker – lead, rhythm and acoustic guitars
Steve Mann – rhythm & acoustic guitars, guitar solos on track 10, middle co-solo on track 3, keyboards, backing vocals
Rocky Newton – bass guitar, backing vocals
Bodo Schopf – drums

Additional musicians
Emi Canyn, Donna McDaniel, Dave Amato, Chris Post – additional backing vocals

Production
Frank Filipetti – producer, mixing
Russell Anderson, John Herman, Mike Tacci – engineers
Ted Jensen – mastering

Charts
Album - Billboard (United States)

Singles - Billboard (United States)

References

1989 albums
McAuley Schenker Group albums
Capitol Records albums
Albums produced by Frank Filipetti